Duck End Mill, Letch's Mill or Finchingfield Post Mill is a grade II listed Post mill at Finchingfield, Essex, England which has been restored.

History

Duck End Mill was built in the mid eighteenth century, dates of 1756, 1760 1773 and 1777 being recorded in the mill. It was originally built as an open trestle mill, the roundhouse being added in 1840. The mill was insured for £50 in 1790 and £100 in 1794. The mill was working until c. 1890, and had an all wood windshaft to the last. This was replaced by the cast iron one from Gainsford End Mill, Toppesfield in the 1950s. A replacement wooden windshaft has since been fitted.

Description

Duck End Mill is a post mill with a single storey roundhouse. The mill is winded by a tailpole. It has four Spring sails. There was one pair of millstones, driven by an  Brake Wheel.

Millers

Samuel Stammers 1790 - 1807
Edward Stammers 1807 - 1817
Edward Letch 1817 - 1852
Edward Letch Jr 1852 -
Andrew Luke Letch -1890

References for above:-

Public access

The mill is open to the public on the one Sunday of each month in the summer.

References

External links
Essex Country Parks webpage on Finchingfield Post Mill.
Windmill World webpage on Duck End Mill.

Post mills in the United Kingdom
Grinding mills in the United Kingdom
Industrial buildings completed in 1756
Grade II listed buildings in Essex
Museums in Essex
Mill museums in England
Windmills in Essex
Finchingfield
Grade II listed windmills